Jean-Martin Petit (22 July 1772 in Paris – 8 June 1856 in Paris) was a French General during the Napoleonic Wars.

Notes

References
 

Generals of the First French Empire
Military personnel from Paris
1772 births
1856 deaths
Names inscribed under the Arc de Triomphe
Grand Croix of the Légion d'honneur